Since the island country's independence in 1966, the economy of Barbados has been transformed from a low-income economy dependent upon sugar production into a high-income economy based on tourism and the offshore sector. Barbados went into a deep recession in the 1990s after 3 years of steady decline brought on by fundamental macroeconomic imbalances. After a painful re-adjustment process, the economy began to grow again in 1993. Growth rates have averaged between 3%–5% since then. The country's three main economic drivers are: tourism, the international business sector, and foreign direct-investment. These are supported in part by Barbados operating as a service-driven economy and an international business centre.

By the end of 2012 the Barbados economy still exhibited signs of weakness. Their main export (12.53% a value of $96.5 million) is liquor, closely followed by frozen-fish (8%) and preserved-milk (6.23%) to Nigeria (a total of 41.38% at $319 million) with nearly three-quarters of the imports (61.05% at $3 billion in natural-rubber and cocoa-beans) originating from there.  Although it is often quoted that Barbados' main produce is "sugar", there are only two working sugar factories remaining in the country (in the 19th century there were 10). At the end of 2013, Barbados' economy continued to exhibit signs of weakness. In June 2018 Barbados announced the default on its bonds, after revealing that its debt amounted to $7.5 billion (the fourth highest debt in debt-to-GDP ratio in the world).

History

Pre-independence 
Since the first settlement by the British in 1625, through history the economy of Barbados was primarily dependent on agriculture. It had been recorded that minus the marshes and gully regions, during the 1630s much of the desirable land had been deforested across the entire island. In the 1640s,

Barbados shifted from small-scale mixed crop farming using indentured labor to large-scale sugar production, introduced by the Jewish community that immigrated to Barbados when exiled from Dutch Brazil. Land was divided into large estate-plantations, with a labor-force that was almost entirely made up of enslaved men and women.

Sugar cane became the single best move for the Barbados economy at the time. Barbados soon had built so many windmills that the island had the second highest density of windmills per square mile in the world, after the Netherlands. For about the next 100 years Barbados remained the richest of all the European colonies in the Caribbean region due to sugar. The prosperity in the colony of Barbados remained regionally unmatched until sugar cane production caught up in geographically larger countries such as Jamaica and elsewhere. Despite being eclipsed by larger makers of sugar, Barbados continued to produce the crop well into the 20th century.

While the emancipation of African slaves in the British Empire in 1833,
nominally liberated the slaves, limited access to education and land kept the freed as a disenfranchised underclass. As such, emphasis began to be placed on increased labour rights as well as upward mobility and strong education to combat plantation living.

During the 1920s, politicians in Barbados started a push for more self-government. As the 1940s–1950s rolled around, Barbados moved towards developing political ties with neighbouring Caribbean islands. By 1958 the West Indies Federation was proposed by the British government for Barbados and nine other Caribbean territories. The Federation was first led by the Premier of Barbados, however the experiment ended by 1962. Later, Barbados tried to negotiate several other unions with other islands, yet it became likely that Barbados needed to move on. Subsequently, the island peacefully negotiated its independence with the British Government and the island became independent at midnight on November 30th, 1966.

Post-independence 
After the country became independent of the United Kingdom on 30 November 1966 sugar cane still remained a chief money-maker for Barbados. The island's politicians tried to diversify the economy from just agriculture. During the 1950s–1960s visitors from both Canada and the United Kingdom started transforming tourism into a huge contributor for the Barbadian economy. The man-made Deep Water Harbour port at Bridgetown had been completed in 1961, and thereafter the island could handle most modern oceangoing ships for shipping sugar or handling cargoes at the port facility.

As the 1970s progressed, global companies started to recognise Barbados for its highly educated population. In May 1972 Barbados formed its own Central Bank, breaking off from the East Caribbean Currency Authority (ECCA). By 1975 the Barbadian dollar was changed to a new fixed / constant rate of exchange rate with the US$ with the rate being changed to present day US$1 = BBD$1.98 (BBD$1.00 = ~US$0.50).

By the 1980s a growing manufacturing industry was seen as a considerable earner for the Barbados economy. With manufacturing then being led by companies such as Intel Corporation and others, the Manufacturing industry contributed greatly to the economy during the 1980s and early 1990s.

In the early 1990s the country's economy was hit hard when real GDP per capita declined by 5.1% per year between 1989 and 1992 partly due to the 1990 oil price spike. Barbados entered into an agreement with the International Monetary Fund financial assistance after a long and hard period of negotiations between the IMF, the government of Barbados, labour unions and employers. This led to a protocol on wages and prices in 1993. This helped prevent an inflationary spiral and restored the island's international competitiveness thereby leading to a period of long-term economic growth of 2.7% between 1993 and 2000.

As one of the founding members, Barbados joined the World Trade Organization on 1 January 1995. Following the membership in the World Trade Organization (WTO), the Government of Barbados aggressively tried to make the Barbados economy fully WTO compliant. This led to collapse of much of the manufacturing industry of Barbados during the late 1990s in favour of many companies like Intel and others moving to lower cost Asian economies. During the late 1990s more companies started to become interested in Barbados' offshore sector, until it over took sugar as the new chief money maker. In 1999–2000 the Organisation for Economic Co-operation and Development (OECD) "blacklist" was circulated with Barbados listed in error. The negative fallout stymied new investment into Barbados' offshore sector Barbados for near two years as Barbados authorities acted swiftly successfully proving that Barbados' economy was regulated sufficiently to ward off financial criminal activity and that it was not a "tax haven" as charged, but instead a low-tax regime.

As the global recession hit in 2001, the offshore sector in Barbados slightly contracted further thereby making Tourism as the new chief money maker, after having earlier eclipsed manufacturing and sugar cane. The Government of Barbados further changed legislation to transform the Barbados economy into one which fosters investment. Leading to several new Hotel developments. The government continues to try maintaining constraint from personal involvement in the Hotel activity and instead seeks private investment into the Barbados economy for future growth.

Several large hotel projects like the Port Charles Marina project in Speightstown helped the tourism industry continue to expand in 1996–99, and more recently the new Hilton Hotel on Needhams Point, Saint Michael in 2005.

Various firms from Wall Street in New York provide routine economic analysis of the Barbadian economy. This has included such firms as Standard & Poor's and Moody's.

Data 
The following table shows the main economic indicators in 1980–2021 (with IMF staff estimates in 2022–2027). Inflation below 5% is in green.

Current 
As of 2008, Barbados has a GDP (PPP) of $5.466 billion, a GDP (official exchange rate) of $3.777 billion, a GDP real growth rate of 1.5%, and a per capita PPP of $19,300. The GDP is composed of the following sectors: agriculture 6%, industry 16%, and services 78% (2000 est.). As of 2001, it had a labor force of 128,500, of which 10% were in agriculture, 15% in industry, and 75% in services (1996 est.). The unemployment rate in 2003 was 10.7%, and the inflation rate in 2007 was 5.5%. The Barbadian government had estimated revenues of $847 million (including grants) in 2000, and expenditures of $886 million. The industrial production growth rate was -3.2%.

Offshore finance and informatics are important foreign exchange earners, and there is also a light manufacturing sector. The government continues its efforts to reduce the unacceptably high unemployment rate, which it met in the 1990s, encourage direct foreign investment, and privatise remaining state-owned enterprises.

The main factors responsible for the improvement in economic activity include an expansion in the number of tourist arrivals, an increase in manufacturing, and an increase in sugar production. Recently, offshore banking and financial services also have become an important source of foreign exchange and economic growth.

Economic growth has led to net increases in employment in the tourism sector, as well as in construction and other services sub-sectors of the economy. The public service remains Barbados' largest single employer. Total labour force has increased from 126,000 in 1993 to 140,000 persons in 2000, and unemployment has dropped significantly from over 20% in the early 1990s to 9.3% at the end of 2000.

The Barbados government encourages the development in: financial services, informatics, e-commerce, tourism, educational and health services, and cultural services for the future. In 2000 based on Barbados' level of growth – (at the time) Barbados was supposed to become the world's smallest developed country by 2008. This had then been restated as being achievable by around 2025.

In May 2018 The Prime Minister Mia Mottley disclosed previously uncovered financial obligations of the state. The Prime Minister said that the new government inherited 15 billion Barbados dollars of debt (about 7.5 billion US dollars). Disclosure of information about the current level of debt has led to an increase in the debt-to-GDP ratio from 137% to 175%. This is the fourth value in the world after Japan, Greece, and Sudan. Mia Mottley announced that new government had no other choice than to ask the IMF to facilitate debt restructuring. On 5 June 2018 Barbados didn't fulfill its obligation to pay the 26th coupon on Eurobonds maturing in 2035. According to Cbonds, excluding the disclosure of the true level of debt, on 7 June 2018 the country had 47 debt issues in circulation totaling 4.425 billion US dollars.

Wages 
Although Barbadians have been ranked as being on the high end of wages compared to those in the Americas, prices for food, goods and services are also extremely high. The only legislated minimum wage in Barbados is for shop assistants, where wages can be no less than BBD$5.00 (~ US$2.50) per hour.

In October 2009, Dr. DeLisle Worrell, who later become the replacement governor of Barbados' Central Bank of Barbados and was executive director of the Centre for Money and Finance at the UWI Cave Hill Campus revealed that "the average Barbadian now earns between BBD$200 and BBD$499 per week...."

In 2010 Barbados' population was tabulated at some 281,968 with 80% at working age yet less than half (106,241 or 38%) were actually registered as employed.

Of these the overall estimates of his finds showed that:
There was a roughly 4,400 (1.6%) workers who earned less than BBD$200 (US$100) per week.
There were 32,800 (12%) workers who earned between BBD$200 (US$100) and BBD$499 (US$249.50) a week.
About 19,100 (7%) workers who earned from BBD$500 (US$250) to BBD$999(US$449.50),
3,700 (1.3%) workers who earned between BBD$1000 (US$500) and BBD$1300(US$650), and
4,100 (1.5%) who earned more than BBD$1300 (US$650) a week.

Taxation

General 
In 1997 Barbados implemented a general taxation that covers most items. Known as the Value-Added Tax ("VAT") it covers almost all items at a 17.5% tax rate and an 8.75% for hotel accommodations. Exported goods and services, prescription drugs and a few other specific items are zero rated under the legislation. The VAT replaced several other taxes such as: the Consumption Tax, Surcharge, Excise Tax and an Environmental Levy. People operating under Barbados' VAT regime must be registered for VAT and from 1 December 2010, the threshold for VAT registration has been BBD$80,000 (previously BBD$60,000).

The island continues to wean off of taxes outside of the VAT system. In 2002 the Barbados government increased the level of people in Barbados who are exempt from having to pay taxes on their homes. This has steadily grown with the island heading for a possible rate of 0% taxation in all other areas.

The government has also toyed with the idea of making retirement savings as tax exempt, to encourage Barbadians to spend less on goods and to encourage Barbadians to save more income as they once used to.

Building and land owners are liable to land tax on the market value of their property at rates currently ranging from 0.1 per cent (for valuations from BBD$150,000) to 0.75 per cent (BBD$1,000,000) on all properties (revalued on a three-year basis) and there are approximately 115,000 parcels listed. Exemptions include crown land; University of the West Indies; religious and benevolent organizations (of which there are many thousands); cemeteries; etc.

Personal income tax was lowered from 20% to 17.5% in 2012 and applied on income of less than BBD$30,000 with a rate of 35% apply on income over BBD$30,000 and individuals who are both resident and domiciled in Barbados are taxed on their worldwide income. Generally, persons paying salaries or wages or other emoluments must withhold tax from remuneration paid to employees (PAYE). Every individual between the ages of 16 and 65, who is employed in Barbados must be insured under the National Insurance and Social Security Act and contributions are determined as a percentage of insurable earnings up to a maximum of $4,090 per month or $944 per week up to 13.5% (6.5% from employee and 6.5% from employer).

A new tax, called the Municipal Solid Waste Tax, was introduced and took effective in 2014.

Tax on Income, Profits and Capital Gains include: Income Tax, Corporate Tax, Withholding Tax, and Insurance Premium Tax.

Tax on Goods and Services include: Consumption Tax, Excise Taxes, Value Added Tax, Hotel & Restaurant Tax, Other Taxes on Goods and Services (includes Licenses, Motor Vehicle Tax, and Selective Taxes on Services).

Corporation tax rates charge 'Regular' companies 25% and 'Small' companies 15%. Employers must remit tax withheld from employees' emoluments to the Department of Inland Revenue by the 15th day of the next month after they deducted the tax.

Stamp duty tax is still levied on sale of shares of companies listed on the Barbados Stock Exchange; on sale of real estate, leases and shares in public companies; and on mortgages.

Bilateral treaties 
Barbados has several bilateral tax treaties, mostly aimed at removing double taxation on companies that operate in the Barbados economy. Since Barbados is at times considered an expensive place to conduct business, the treaties are mainly a measure to provide some savings to international businesses that operate in Barbados. Countries that Barbados has taxation agreements with include:
Austria,
Botswana,
Canada,
China,
CARICOM,
Cuba,
Finland,
Luxembourg
Malta,
Mauritius,
Mexico,
Netherlands
Norway,
Panama,
Seychelles,
Spain,
Sweden,
Switzerland,
the United Kingdom,
the United States and
Venezuela.
Source: Barbados Government website containing the text of the majority of the above tax treaties

The bilateral tax treaty negotiated with Canada in particular has been a political-football for the government of that country. The treaty was made to allow the profits for IBCs and offshore banking companies to be repatriated to Canada tax-free after paying taxes in Barbados. The aim was mainly for companies like the Canadian Imperial Bank of Commerce (CIBC), Royal Bank of Canada (RBC), and Scotiabank, which (along with Barclays of the United Kingdom), when-combined control a healthy majority of Barbados' local Commercial Banking sector. In essence the treaty makes the economy of Barbados almost an unofficial part of the Canadian economy and it was aimed at allowing Canadian companies to extract profits back to Canada more easily.

Primary industries

Agriculture 

About , or 37.2% of the total land area, are classified as arable. At one time, nearly all arable land was devoted to sugarcane, but the percentage devoted to ground crops for local consumption has been increasing. In 1999, 500,000 tons of sugarcane were produced, down from the annual average of 584,000 tons in 1989–91. In 2001, sugar exports amounted to US$22 million, or 8.4% of total exports. Major food crops ("Ground provisions") are yams, sweet potatoes, corn, eddoes, cassava, and several varieties of beans. Inadequate rainfall and lack of irrigation has prevented the development of other agricultural activity, although some vegetable farming takes place on a commercial scale. Some cotton is also grown in drier parts of the island, but until cotton can be picked by machine it is unlikely that output will rise to its former level.

Animal husbandry 
Livestock rearing isn't a major occupation in Barbados, chiefly because good pasture has always been scarce & imported animal feed is expensive. The island must import large quantities of meat and dairy products. Most livestock is owned by individual households. Estimates for 1999 showed 23,000 head of cattle, 41,000 sheep, 33,000 hogs, 5,000 goats, and 4,000,000 chickens. Poultry production in 1999 included 9,000 tons of meat and 1,000 tons of hen eggs. Apart from self-sufficiency in milk and poultry, the limited agricultural sector means that Barbados imports large amounts of basic foods, including wheat and meat.

Fishing 
The fishing industry employs about 2,000 persons, and the fleet consists of more than 500 powered boats. The catch in 2000 was 3,100 metric tons. Flying fish, dolphin fish, tuna, turbot, kingfish, and swordfish are among the main species caught. A fisheries terminal complex opened at Oistins in 1983.

Forestry 
There are an estimated  of forested land, covering about 12% of the total land area. Roundwood production in 2000 totalled 5,000 cu m (176,500 cu ft), and imports amounted to 3,000 cu m (106,000 cu ft). In 2000, Barbados imported $35.3 million in wood and forest products.

Mining 
Deposits of limestone and coral were quarried to meet local construction needs. Production of limestone in 2000 amounted to 1.5 million tons. Clays and shale, sand and gravel, and carbonaceous deposits provided limited yields. Hydraulic cement production totalled 267,659 tons in 2000, up from 106,515 in 1996.

Oil production is also undertaken in Barbados, with much of the on-shore activity taking place in Woodbourne, Saint Philip.

Secondary industries

Manufacturing 

The manufacturing sector in Barbados has yet to recover from the recession of the late 1980s when many bankruptcies occurred and almost one-third of the workforce lost their jobs. Today, approximately 10,000 Barbadians work in manufacturing. The electronics sector in particular was badly hit when the U.S. semi-conductor company, Intel, closed its factory in 1986. Except for traditional manufacturing—such as sugar refining and rum distilling—Barbados's industrial activity is partly aimed at the local market, which produces goods such as tinned food, drinks, and cigarettes. Many industrial estates are located throughout the island. A cement factory is located in St. Lucy.

Export markets have been severely damaged by competition from cheaper Caribbean and Latin American countries. But domestic manufacturing also faces serious potential problems, as trade liberalisation means that the government can no longer protect national industries by imposing high tariffs on imported goods. Thus, Barbadian manufacturers must compete with other regional economies with lower wage costs and other overhead. The other significant industrial employer is the petroleum sector. Oil deposits are located in the southern parishes, but oil has not been produced in commercial quantities. The island's one small oil refinery closed in 1998 and moved refining to Trinidad and Tobago, where labour and other costs are cheaper.

Construction 
A construction boom, linked to tourism and residential development, has assisted the recovery of a large cement plant in the north of the island that was closed for some years and reopened in 1997.

Tertiary industries

Tourism 
Tourism is Barbados's crucial economic activity and has been since the 1960s. At least 10 percent of the working population (some 13,000 people) are employed in this sector, which offers a range of tourist accommodations from luxury hotels to modest self-catering establishments. After the recession years, tourism picked up again in the mid-1990s, only to face another slowdown in 1999. This drop was in part due to increasing competition from other Caribbean countries such as the Dominican Republic, and in part to a reduction in visits from cruise ships as they shifted to non-Caribbean routes or shorter routes such as the Bahamas. Cruise ship visitors totalled 445,821 in 1999, a reduction from 517,888 in 1997, but stay-over visitors rose to 517,869 in 1999, setting a new record. Overall, the country witnessed over US$700 million in tourism receipts in 1999.

A problem in Barbados is that tourist facilities are too densely concentrated on the south coast, which is highly urbanised, while the Atlantic coast—with a rugged shoreline and large waves—is not suitable for beach tourism. There are few large brand-name hotels, which makes marketing the island in the United States difficult. On the other hand, the absence of conglomerates and package tours results in more direct tourist spending among the general population.

Barbados has numerous internationally known hotels. Time-shares are available, and many smaller local hotels and private villas that dot the island have space available if booked in advance. The southern and western coasts of Barbados are popular, with the calm light-blue Caribbean Sea and their white and pinkish sandy beaches. Along the island's east coast, which faces the Atlantic Ocean, there are tumbling waves that are perfect for light surfing. Some areas remain risky to swimmers due to under-tow currents. The Crane beach was named one of the top 10 best beaches in the world.

Shopping districts are popular in Barbados, with ample duty-free shopping. There is also a festive night-life in mainly tourist areas such as the Saint Lawrence Gap. Other attractions include wildlife reserves (Graeme Hall Nature Sanctuary), jewellery stores, scuba diving, helicopter rides, golf, festivals (the largest being the annual Crop Over festival July/Aug), sightseeing, cave exploration (Harrison's Cave), exotic drinks and fine clothes shopping.

Attractions, landmarks and points of interest 
Tourism accounts for almost one half of the economy.
Name / Parish Location:

Informatics 

Informatics employed almost 1,700 workers in 1999, about the same number as the sugar industry. The island has been involved in data processing since the 1980s and now specialises in operations such as database management and insurance claims processing. Costs in Barbados are higher than elsewhere in the Caribbean (although still only half of costs in the United States), but the island offers strong advantages such as a literate English-speaking workforce and location in the same time zone as the eastern United States. Despite these factors, employment has fallen in recent years, reflecting increasing mobility on the part of foreign companies, which frequently relocate to lower-cost areas.

Financial services 
The international business and financial services sector continues to be an important contributor to the economy of Barbados.  During fiscal year 2010/2011 the sector contributed approximately BBD$186 million in corporate taxes – almost 60% of the total corporate tax intake.  At the end of December 2010, there were 45 offshore banks, 242 captive insurance companies, 3,065 international business companies, and 408 international societies with restricted liability.
The financial sector is also under threat of sanctions from the EU and the Organization for Economic Cooperation and Development (OECD), both of which have expressed concerns about money laundering, tax evasion, and other financial improprieties in Caribbean offshore centres.

Cruise industry 
In 2006 the Central Bank governor of Barbados urged the Government to consider investing in a Barbadian cruise ship company.   The government at that time did not invest in that opportunity but it is unknown if it will in future

Rum 
Barbados has three commercial rum distilleries: West Indies Rum Distillers Ltd, Mount Gay Rum and Four Square. Mount Gay Eclipse Silver is one of the most recent Rums created back in 2008. There is also St. Nicholas Abbey, a smaller boutique operation.

Retail 
Retailing is an important economic activity, especially in Bridgetown where there are large department stores and supermarkets. In the countryside, most stores are small and family-run. Some 18,000 people work in the retail sector.

See also 

 Barbadian dollar
 Barbados Stock Exchange
 Central Bank of Barbados
 Central banks and currencies of the Caribbean
 Economy of the Caribbean
 Telecommunications in Barbados
 List of Barbadian companies
 List of countries by credit rating
 List of Commonwealth of Nations countries by GDP
 List of countries by future gross government debt
 List of countries by leading trade partners
 List of countries by public debt
 List of countries by tax revenue as percentage of GDP
 List of countries by wealth per adult
 List of Latin American and Caribbean countries by GDP growth
 List of Latin American and Caribbean countries by GDP (nominal)
 List of Latin American and Caribbean countries by GDP (PPP)

References

Further reading 
 
 
 The Commonwealth of Nations – Barbados economy
 Totally Barbados – Economy
   – Barbados Private Sector Trade Team
 
 
 
 World Bank Summary Trade Statistics Barbados

External links 
 
Barbados Eligible For Dividend Tax Benefits, Says IRS – Tax-News.com
Standard & Poor's review on B'dos Economy – Positive points – 27 July 2006
WTO reports on trade policy of Barbados – 18 September 2008
WTO announces role for Barbados in Task Force – February, 09th, 2006
 A summary of the Budget – The B'dos Annual budget for the year 2006–2007
 Value Added Tax refunds total $44.2M (US$22.1M)
 Barbados 2005 economic performance to be reviewed
 Barbados, Atlas MIT.edu

 
Barbados